Rudolf Karl Czech (15 September 1930 – 8 September 1975) was a Polish ice hockey player. He played for Budowlani Opole, Odra Opole, and Legia Warsaw during his career. He also played for the Polish national team at the 1952 and 1956 Winter Olympics, and the 1955, 1957, and 1958 World Championships. He won the Polish league championship four years in a row with Legia, from 1954 to 1957. In 1958 while in West Germany for a tournament, Czech defected, joining family already living there. He moved to Düsseldorf, and died suddenly in 1975 while in Krefeld.

References

External links
 

1930 births
1975 deaths
Ice hockey players at the 1952 Winter Olympics
Ice hockey players at the 1956 Winter Olympics
Legia Warsaw (ice hockey) players
Olympic ice hockey players of Poland
Polish defectors
Polish emigrants to Germany
Polish ice hockey centres
Sportspeople from Opole